Jovana is a Serbian feminine name. People with the name include:

Jovana Brakočević, Serbian volleyball player
Jovana Crnogorac, Serbian cyclist
Jovana Damnjanović, Serbian football player
Jovana Jakšić, Serbian tennis player
Jovana Janković, Serbian television presenter
Jovana Jovičić, Serbian volleyball player
Jovana Jovović, Serbian handball player
Jovana Karakašević, Serbian basketball player
Jovana Kovačević, Serbian handball player
Jovana Marjanović, Serbian beauty pageant
Jovana Milosevic, Australian handball player
Jovana Mrkić, Montenegrin football player
Jovana Nikolić, Serbian figure skater
Jovana Pašić, Montenegrin basketball player
Jovana Petrović (boen 2001), Serbian women's football goalkeeper
Jovana Preković, Serbian karateka, Olympic champion
Jovana Rad, Serbian basketball player
Jovana Rapport, Serbian chess player
Jovana Rogić, Serbian judoka
Jovana Risović, Serbian handball player
Jovana Sretenović, Serbian football player
Jovana Stevanović, Serbian volleyball player
Jovana Stoiljković, Serbian handball player
Jovana Terzić, Montenegrin swimmer
Jovana Vesović, Serbian volleyball player

Serbian feminine given names
Feminine given names